Cistus monspeliensis is a species of rockrose known by the common name Montpellier cistus. It is native to southern Europe and northern Africa, in the Mediterranean forests, woodlands, and scrub ecosystems of matorral—maquis shrublands.

Description

Cistus monspeliensis is a shrub with narrow evergreen leaves and a hairy, glandular, sticky surface. The leaves are linear to lance-shaped, green, with a rugose, wrinkled upper surface, up to 5 centimeters long. In cultivation, C. monspeliensis attains a height of around one meter and a width of 1.5 metres.

The plant's inflorescence is generally a panicle of 2 to 8 flowers, each with five sepals and five white petals.

Distribution
It is mainly distributed throughout the western Mediterranean Basin (Portugal, including Madeira; Spain, including the Canary Islands and Balearic Islands; Morocco; southern France, including Corsica; Italy, including Sardinia and Sicily; Malta; Algeria; Tunisia) but it is also present in Croatia; Serbia; Albania; Montenegro; Greece and Cyprus.

The plant has been reported elsewhere as an introduced species, and in California as an invasive species.

Phylogeny
Cistus monspeliensis belongs to the white and whitish pink flowered clade of Cistus species.

References

External links
 Jepson Manual Treatment - Cistus monspeliensis

monspeliensis
Flora of North Africa
Matorral shrubland
Plants described in 1753
Garden plants of Europe
Drought-tolerant plants
Taxa named by Carl Linnaeus
Flora of Malta